Rooster is a 1982 made-for-television film starring Paul Williams and Pat McCormick who were reunited after their pairing in the Smokey and the Bandit movies. Rooster is an unsold television pilot written and produced by Glen A. Larson for 20th Century Fox Television and broadcast as a two-hour movie on ABC on August 19, 1982 and was rebroadcast on July 24, 1983.

Plot summary
A physically small police psychologist (Paul Williams) and a physically large insurance detective (Pat McCormick) team up on an arson case.

Cast

 Paul Williams as Rooster Steele
 Pat McCormick as Sweets McBride
 J. D. Cannon as Chief Willard T. Coburn
 Ed Lauter as Jack Claggert
 Jill St. John as Joanna Van Eegan
 Delta Burke as Laura DeVega
 Kathrine Baumann as Amy Hammond
 Charlie Callas as Francis A. Melville
 Henry Darrow as Dr. Sanchez
 Pamela Hensley as Bunny Richter
 Lara Parker as Janet
 William Daniels as Dr. DeVega
 John Saxon as Jerome Brademan
 Eddie Albert as Rev. Harlan Barnum
 Marie Osmond as Sister Mae Davis
 Dan Pastorini as Himself
 Dusty Baker as Himself
 Jerry Reuss as Himself
 Mike Scioscia as Himself

External links
 

1982 films
1982 television films
Television films as pilots
Television pilots not picked up as a series
20th Century Fox Television films
Films scored by Stu Phillips
Films directed by Russ Mayberry